Manfred Roeder (August 20, 1900 – October 18, 1971) was a military judge in Nazi Germany. Serving on the highest wartime court, he led the investigation and examinations and later the prosecution of the German Resistance group, the Red Orchestra. He shared responsibility for the dozens of death sentences handed down by the Reich court martial to Red Orchestra members. After Germany's defeat in World War II, there were attempts by survivors, family and the U.S. Army to investigate the prosecutions of Red Orchestra members and others, but Roeder was never convicted of any malfeasance or crime because the Allies thought it more expedient to use his 'expertise' to hunt down the Red Orchestra members a second time than to mete out justice for victims of the Nazis; this time to aid the Western Allies with information about the Russians in the nascent cold war.

Life and career 
Roeder, the son of a Landgericht director from Kiel, served in World War I in the 83rd Field Artillery as a lieutenant. He was later awarded an Iron Cross (2nd Class) for having been gassed. Following the war, Roeder joined the Freikorps and later went to university to pursue a law degree.

He became a judge in 1934 and soon after, was made a military judge in the legal services of the Luftwaffe in April 1935. Roeder was the original investigating Nazi attorney in the Red Orchestra case and he later became the prosecuting attorney.

Roeder was known to Hitler and Göring as one of the hardest and most loyal military judges; prisoners nicknamed him "Hitler's blood judge", a name also given to Roland Freisler.

Postwar investigations and legal battle 

On September 15, 1945, former Prussian Culture Minister Adolf Grimme, a friend of the executed Adam Kuckhoff and himself a former member of the Red Orchestra, filed a complaint against Roeder for perversion of justice in his role as investigating attorney and prosecutor of the case. A few months later, the U.S. Army began investigating the case of Mildred Harnack, an American citizen and wife of one of the Red Orchestra's leading members. She had met and married Arvid Harnack in Wisconsin, then followed him back to Germany in 1929. They were both arrested in connection with the Red Orchestra and accused by the Nazis of being spies for the Soviet Union.

The U.S. Army War Crimes Group began investigating Mildred Harnack's case for denial of due process in February 1946. Though her arrest had been kept secret and she had been denied the right to hear or confront her accusers and the U.S. Army determined that she and her husband had been tortured, in November 1946, the War Crimes Group determined her case had been properly handled. On January 15, 1947, with the cold war in full swing and Mildred Harnack's CIC file stamped "SECRET" (see photo), the case was closed with the note that it "should not have been referred for investigation" and ordering the office to halt its investigation.

In 1951, the case being pursued in the German legal system was similarly halted by the state's attorney in Lüneburg for lack of reasonable suspicion. The final report came to the conclusion that the trials before the Reich court martial were not objectionable and the accused were rightly sentenced to death, since in every age treason has been treated as the "most ignominious crime" and the participants in the July 20, 1944 plot to assassinate Hitler were driven in broad measure by treason and espionage.
During the early 1950s Roeder unabashedly continued his public attacks on, and defamation of, the surviving members of the 'Rote Kapelle'. He cited the cost of their 'treason' in terms of German military losses while glossing over the millions of deaths caused by the Nazi regime he himself was still defending.

Adolf Grimme, Günther Weisenborn, and particularly Greta Kuckhoff, tried to file a lawsuit against Roeder for "crimes against humanity" for having used torture, but the case was delayed by the state's attorney in Lüneburg until the end of the 1960s, at which point it was closed and dropped. No case was ever brought against Roeder to determine if his method of using torture to obtain information or the sentences he pursued in court constituted crimes.

Sources 
 Helmut Kramer: "Als hätten sie nie das Recht gebeugt." In: Ossietzky. 23/2002. Verlag Ossietzky (see external link)
 Hiska D. Bergander: Die Ermittlungen gegen Dr. jur. et rer. pol. Manfred Roeder, einen „Generalrichter“ Hitlers – Eine Untersuchung zur unbewältigten Rechtsgeschichte der NS-Justiz, Doctoral dissertation, Bremen, 2006
 Elke Endrass: Bonhoeffer und seine Richter. Ein Prozess und sein Nachspiel Stuttgart: Kreuz, 2006, 
 Heinrich Grosse: Niemand kann zwei Herren dienen - Zur Geschichte der evangelischen Kirche im Nationalsozialismus und in der Nachkriegszeit" Blumhardt Verlag, Hannover, 2nd edition 2010. 
 Lower Saxony state capital archive: 56 volumes from preliminary proceedings of the Lüneburg state's attorney, fully available at Der Spiegel'' house archive, Hamburg
 Stefan Roloff, Die Rote Kapelle, Ullstein Verlag, München 2002, 
 Stefan Roloff, "The Red Orchestra" documentary with survivors http://when6is9.de/films-and-videos/the-red-orchestra/

Notes

References

External links 
 

1900 births
1971 deaths
Jurists from Kiel
20th-century Freikorps personnel
Luftwaffe World War II generals
Judges in the Nazi Party
Recipients of the Iron Cross (1914), 2nd class
People from the Province of Schleswig-Holstein
Politicide perpetrators